The 1952 Cuban coup d'état took place in Cuba on March 10, 1952, when the Cuban Constitutional Army, led by Fulgencio Batista, intervened in the election that was scheduled to be held on 1 June 1952, staging a coup d'état and establishing a de facto military dictatorship in the country. The coup has been referred to as the Batistazo in Cuban political jargon.

Background 

In 1940 a new democratic constitution had been ratified in Cuba. In order to engage in the elections following the constitution's ratification, Fulgencio Batista resigned from the military to focus on a career in politics. He ran for president with support from the Communist Revolutionary Union party, under the front banner of the Democratic Socialist Coalition. Batista was democratically elected and served a four year tenure. After his tenure the constitution prohibited presidents from running for consecutive terms, so he had a proxy candidate Carlos Saladrigas Zayas run as his substitute. Saladrigas would be defeated in a landslide. After the electoral defeat Batista would leave Cuba for the United States, but remained head of the Cuban army.

As the presidency of Carlos Prío Socarrás came to a close, he became highly criticized for corruption, making Batista believe he could win in the following 1952 election. He was legally allowed to run again since he had not served a term since 1944. Batista ran under the label of his own United Action Party and believed his previous popularity would guarantee him victory. Both of Batista's electoral rivals promised to remove him from his role as head of the army if elected and replaced with Ramón Barquín. An opinion poll before the election predicted Batista coming in dead last in the election. Batista's last source of popular support seemed to be the army that he still was commander of. Concerned about losing the presidency and his role as head of the army, Batista began to plot a coup.

Events 
On March 10 all military garrisons came under rebel military command without resistance. The rebel officers occupied the University of Havana and opposition newspaper offices. Labor leaders were arrested and a communication black out ensued. A military junta formed in Camp Colombia with Fulgencio Batista as its head and declared itself the new government of Cuba.

Aftermath 

The United States recognized his government on March 27.

Cuban Choteo humor became more popular after the coup due to political pessimism in the country. Choteo humor mocked the political establishment and took a self-satirizing approach to portraying the "lack" of capabilities of the Cuban people. Martianismo also became the popular ideology of most of the Cuban political opposition. Before then the ideas of José Martí were less important compared to his image as an authentic Cuban founding father whose invocation gave legitimacy to opposition organizations. After the 1952 coup the ideas and image of José Martí had become so popular within the opposition that Martiano language was the common expression of opposition politics.

Batista (whose rule was formalized after the 1954 general election) went on to rule the country until January 1, 1959, when he was forced into exile with his family (first to the Trujillo–ruled Dominican Republic, then Corporatist Portugal and eventually Francoist Spain). Batista's exile marked the climax of the Cuban Revolution, which started on July 26, 1953, with the attack on the Moncada Barracks in Santiago de Cuba, and saw Fidel Castro emerging as the new leader of Cuba.

See also 
 History of Cuba
 Timeline of Cuban history

References 

Republic of Cuba (1902–1959)
Political history of Cuba
Military history of Cuba
1952 in Cuba
March 1952 events in North America
Conflicts in 1952
1950s coups d'état and coup attempts